is a subway station on the Tokyo Metro Namboku Line in Bunkyo, Tokyo, Japan, operated by the Tokyo subway operator Tokyo Metro. It is numbered "N-13".

Lines
Hon-komagome Station is served by the Tokyo Metro Namboku Line, and lies 13.6 km from the starting point of the line at Meguro.

Station layout
The station is an underground station, with the ticket machines and ticket barriers located on the first basement ("B1F") level, and the platforms on the third basement ("B3F") level.

Platforms
The station has an island platform serving two tracks.

History
Hon-komagome Station opened on 26 March 1996.

The station facilities were inherited by Tokyo Metro after the privatization of the Teito Rapid Transit Authority (TRTA) in 2004.

Passenger statistics
In fiscal 2019, the station was used by an average of 22,933 passengers daily.

Surrounding area
 Toyo University Hakusan campus
 Komagome Gakuen
 Hakusan Jinja shrine

See also
 List of railway stations in Japan

References

External links

 JR Metro station information 

Railway stations in Tokyo
Tokyo Metro Namboku Line
Railway stations in Japan opened in 1996